Chen Guo may refer to:

Chen (state), a vassal state of ancient China's Zhou dynasty
Fruit Chan (born 1959), Hong Kong film director